Marie-Angélique Charlotte, Marquise de Bombelles (née de Mackau; 1762–1800), was a French court office holder and letter writer. She was maid of honour and a personal friend and confidante of Élisabeth of France (1764–1794), and known in history for her correspondence with her, which is preserved.

Life
She was the daughter of Baron Louis Eléonor Dirkheim de Mackau (1727–1767) and Marie-Angélique de Mackau, and the sister of Renée Suzanne de Soucy (1758–1841) and Armand Louis de Mackau (1759–1827).

Her mother served as sous gouvernante (governess) to the royal children, and she herself was a playmate of Élisabeth of France during her childhood and then maid-of-honour prior to her marriage. She was a close personal friend and confidante of Élisabeth, and their correspondence is considered a valuable source of the life of the princess.

Marie-Angélique de Bombelles emigrated after the outbreak of the French Revolution in 1789.

References

 Marc Marie, marquis de Bombelles (1744-1822), et Angélique, marquise de Bombelles (1762-1800), Que je suis heureuse d'être ta femme : Lettres intimes, Evelyne Lever, Editions Tallandier, Paris, 2009

1762 births
1800 deaths
French letter writers
Women letter writers
French ladies-in-waiting
18th-century French women writers
French marchionesses
De Bombelles family
18th-century letter writers